The 2010 Patriot League baseball tournament was held on consecutive weekends with the semifinals held May 15–16 and the finals May 21–22, 2010 to determine the champion of the Patriot League for baseball for the 2010 NCAA Division I baseball season.  The event matched the top four finishers of the six team league in a double-elimination tournament.  Fourth seeded  won their fifth championship and claimed the Patriot's automatic bid to the 2010 NCAA Division I baseball tournament.  Doug Shribman of Bucknell was named Tournament Most Valuable Player.

Format and seeding
The top four finishers from the regular season were seeded one through four, with the top seed hosting the fourth seed and second seed hosting the third. The visiting team was designated as the home team in the second game of each series.  Bucknell hosted Lafayette while Holy Cross visited Army.

Results

All-Tournament Team

References

Tournament
Patriot League Baseball Tournament
Patriot League baseball tournament
Patriot League baseball tournament
Patriot League baseball tournament
Patriot League baseball tournament